Kagoshima Station (鹿児島駅) is a railway station in Kagoshima, Kagoshima Prefecture. It is the notional southern terminus of the Kyushu Railway Company's Kagoshima and Nippo Main Lines, although services on both lines in fact start and terminate at the neighboring Kagoshima-Chūō Station.

Lines 
Kyushu Railway Company
Kagoshima Main Line
Nippo Main Line

JR

Adjacent stations

See also
List of railway stations in Japan

External links
Kagoshima Station (JR Kyūshū)

Railway stations in Japan opened in 1901
Railway stations in Kagoshima Prefecture
Buildings and structures in Kagoshima